Aleksandra Katarzyna Przegalińska-Skierkowska (born 18 January 1982) is a Polish futurist. She is an associate professor of management and artificial intelligence as well as a vice-rector at Kozminski University.

Life 
Przegalińska is a research fellow at the American Institute for Economic Research and the Center for Collective Intelligence at Massachusetts Institute of Technology. She is also a visiting scholar at the Labor & Worklife Center at Harvard University. 

In 2014, she defended her Ph.D. in philosophy at the University of Warsaw, focusing on phenomenology of virtual entities. 

Her recent works include Collaborative society (MIT Press), a 2020 book with Dariusz Jemielniak, in which she discusses the cooperative turn in the society enabled by technology, and Wearable Technologies in Organizations: Privacy, Efficiency and Autonomy in Work (2019, Springer), in which she discusses the privacy and efficiency aspects of wearables in organizations.
She is a host of a radio show about the future and technology, "Coś Osobliwego" (verbatim Something Particular, a wordplay in Polish meaning also Something Singular, referring to singularity).

She is a frequently invited expert in the Polish media, with interviews, among others, for Forbes, Gazeta Wyborcza, TVN, Bankier, Onet, Forsal, or Krytyka Polityczna.

References

External links 

1982 births
Living people
Academic staff of Kozminski University
Futurologists
21st-century Polish philosophers
Polish women philosophers
Polish social scientists
21st-century Polish women scientists
University of Warsaw alumni
Women social scientists